Çandarlı Kara Halil Hayreddin Pasha was the first Grand Vizier of Murad I's reign. He was also technically the first in Ottoman history who held the title "Grand Vizier" (although several before him held equivalent but differently named offices), the first who had a military background (his predecessors under Orhan I came from the class of learned men, the "ilmiye"), and the first member of the illustrious Çandarlı family to hold high office. His family was to mark the rise of the Ottoman Empire between 1360 and 1450. 

He rose to the rank of grand vizier from the position of the chief military judge (kazasker) in September 1364 and held this top seat after the sultan until his death on January 22, 1387. As such, he became the grand vizier who had the longest term of administration, a record he would hold until the abolition of the position 535 years after his death in 1922. He was also notable for being the initiator of the "devşirme" system of recruitment in the Ottoman Empire. Çandarlı Kara Halil Pasha is not to be confused with his grandson, Çandarlı Halil Pasha the Younger, grand vizier under the reign of Murad II and during the first years of that of Mehmed II.

Çandarlı Kara Halil Pasha gave the idea for the formation of elite corps of soldiers. Later they were recruited through the Devshirme, also known as the blood tax or tribute in blood. In this way, the Janissary elite infantry units were formed.

He was succeeded as grand vizier by his son Çandarlı Ali Pasha. His other son, Çandarlı Ibrahim Pasha the Elder, would also later serve as grand vizier.

See also
 Çandarlı family
 List of Ottoman Grand Viziers

References

1387 deaths
Pashas
14th-century Grand Viziers of the Ottoman Empire
Turks from the Ottoman Empire
Kazasker
Year of birth unknown
Halil Hayreddin